David Weeks may refer to:

 David Weeks (politician), former Conservative Leader of Westminster City Council
 David Weeks (designer) (born 1968), American designer
 David F. Weeks (1874–1929), American football player, coach, and doctor
 J. David Weeks (born 1953), member of the South Carolina House of Representatives